HC-030031 is a drug which acts as a potent and selective antagonist for the TRPA1 receptor, and has analgesic and antiinflammatory effects.

References 

Xanthines
Acetamides